The following highways are numbered 600:

Canada
Alberta Highway 600
Saskatchewan Highway 600
 Ontario Highway 600

Korea, South
 Busan Ring Expressway

United States